Guy-Hervé Imboua, better known by his stage name H Magnum, is a French rapper of Ivorian origin signed to the LoudSchool Production record label.

Guy-Hervé Imboua was born in Yopougon, Ivory Coast, and immigrated at the age of 9 years old to France and resided in the 20th arrondissement of Paris. He started rapping in various bands, notably Aconit, a collective of young rappers from Saint-Blaise region, and appeared in various compilations. He later joined the rap collective L'Injection Lyricale. Gaining fame, he opened for Akon on 11 April 2009 at Bercy and performed alongside IAM at Zénith de Paris on 27 June 2009.

In 2012 he released his own materials in the album Dream. He has also collaborated with many rappers including Kery James, Intouchables, Diam'S and Sexion d'Assaut.

Discography

Albums

Singles

Others / Videography
2012: "Qui vivra verra"
2013: "L'appât du gain"
2013: "Mi amor"

Featured in

References

French rappers
French people of Ivorian descent
Living people
Year of birth missing (living people)